Therese Krupp (1790–1850) was a German industrialist.  She was married to Friedrich Krupp and took over the Krupp company after his death in 1826. She is referred to as the matriarch of the Krupp dynasty and credited with the preservation of the Krupp industries, which was in a very bad state at the time of her takeover, a development she managed to turn around.

References

1790 births
1850 deaths
19th-century German businesswomen
19th-century German businesspeople
German industrialists
People of the Industrial Revolution
Krupp family
Businesspeople from Essen
19th-century industrialists